Ma Mone Lay Nae Ngapali is a 2000 Burmese romantic comedy-drama film, directed by Sin Yaw Mg Mg starring Yan Aung, Dwe, May Than Nu and Eaindra Kyaw Zin.

Cast
Yan Aung as U Ko Ko Tin
Dwe as Maung Maung
May Than Nu as Wutyi
Eaindra Kyaw Zin as Dr. Moon
Moe Di as Uncle Htoo
Nwet Nwet San as Daw Nit
Hsu Pan Htwar as Ohn Mar
Gone Pone as Kay Thi

References

2000 films
2000s Burmese-language films
Burmese comedy-drama films
Films shot in Myanmar
Burmese romantic comedy films